Trefor may refer to:

People

Given name Trefor
 Trefor Evans (born 1947), former Wales international rugby union player
 Trefor Jenkins (born 1932), Welsh-born South African human geneticist
 Trefor Richard Morgan (1914–1970), Welsh nationalist activist and businessman
 Trefor Morris (born 1934), Chief Inspector of Constabulary for England, Wales and Northern Ireland from 1993 to 1996
 Trefor Owen (1933–2001), Welsh amateur footballer
 Trefor Proud, make-up artist in film and television
 Trefor Pugh, former New Zealand international footballer

Surname Trefor
 Dafydd Trefor (died 1528?), Welsh cleric and bard
 John Trefor, British television director and producer
 John Trevor (died 1357), Ieuan Trefor in Welsh, first bishop of St Asaph, Wales
 John Trevor (died 1410), Ieuan Trefor in Welsh, Bishop of St Asaph, Wales, and Anti-Bishop of St Andrews in Scotland

Places

Places in Wales, UK
 Trefor, Anglesey, a hamlet
 Trefor, Gwynedd, a village
 Trevor, Wrexham, a village called Trefor in Welsh

See also

 Trevor (disambiguation)
 Trevorrow
 Trev
 

Welsh masculine given names